The Essential Neil Diamond is a two-disc compilation album by Neil Diamond. It was released by Sony Music in 2001.

Diamond and his collaborator Al Quaglieri personally chose the 38 tracks that appeared in the collection. Nine selections were from Diamond's early period with Bang Records (1966–68) while 14 were from his Columbia years, which began in 1973. The Bang recordings are now owned by Sony, Columbia's parent company. For the five top ten hits that Diamond record for Uni Records (1968–73) Columbia leased the right for their appearance on this collection. Ten recordings that were used for the album were not the original studio recordings but live renditions from concerts. "You Don't Bring Me Flowers", Diamond's 1978 duet with Streisand is included in The Essential Barbra Streisand as well as this compilation. The Essential Neil Diamond reached number 90 on the Billboard 200 chart and was awarded double platinum status by the RIAA on March 3, 2016.

In 2009, Columbia issued an expanded version of the album entitled  The Essential Neil Diamond 3.0 which featured the original two discs and a bonus third disc containing eight more selections.

Track listing

Certifications

References

2001 compilation albums
Neil Diamond compilation albums
Columbia Records compilation albums
Albums produced by Jeff Barry
Albums produced by Ellie Greenwich
Albums produced by Tom Catalano
Albums produced by Bob Gaudio
2001 greatest hits albums